The 1928–29 PCHL season was the first season of the professional men's ice hockey Pacific Coast Hockey League, a minor professional league with teams in the western United States and western Canada. It consisted of four teams: Vancouver Lions, Seattle Eskimos, Portland Buckaroos and Victoria Cubs.

It was followed by the 1929–30 PCHL season.

The season ran 36 games and the two best teams in the league standings met in a best-of-five playoff format series for league championship honors.

Final standings 
Note: W = Wins, L = Losses, T = Ties, GF= Goals For, GA = Goals Against
Teams that qualified for the playoffs are highlighted in bold

Source:

Playoffs
Vancouver Lions defeated Seattle Eskimos 3 games to 0 (2-0, 3–1, 4-2).

References

Notes

1928–29 in Canadian ice hockey
1928–29 in American ice hockey